Mostafa Kamal Uddin is a retired senior secretary and currently the chairman of Bangladesh Biman, the national airlines of Bangladesh.

Early life 
Kamal Uddin was born in Anwara Upazila of Chattogram District. He completed his BSc (Hons.) and MSc in Zoology from Chittagong College and University of Chittagong respectively.

Career 
Kamal Uddin joined the 5th batch of Bangladesh Civil Service in admin cadre in 1984.

In September 2009, Kamal Uddin was the executive director of Bangladesh Shipping Corporation. He was promoted from joint secretary to additional secretary.

On 25  August 2017, Kamal Uddin was appointed the secretary of the Public Security Division at the Ministry of Home Affairs. He oversaw the rollout of the emergency 999 helpline.  

In April 2019, cUddin was present at the surrender ceremony of 614 outlaws in Pabna District. In February 2021, he requested the Indian secretary of Home Affairs to deploy the use of none lethal weapons at the Bangladesh-India border. They also discussed cross border crimes. Kamal Uddin was the special guest while the Minister of Home Affairs Asaduzzaman Khan Kamal the chief guest at the 25th founding anniversary of Bangladesh Coast Guard.

Kamal Uddin retired from the post of Senior Secretary at the Minister of Home Affairs on 12 January 2023. He was appointed the chairman of the board of directors of Biman Bangladesh Airlines on 15 January 2023. He replaced Sajjadul Hassan. In February 2023, the Anti-Corruption Commission sued 23 employees of Bangladesh Biman over financial irregularities in the leasing of two Boeing 777-200 from Egyptair resulting in a 1.1 billion BDT loss for Bangladesh Biman.

References 

Living people
Bangladeshi civil servants
1963 births
University of Chittagong alumni